List of Brazilian military aircraft is a list of historic military aircraft that have served with the Brazilian Armed Forces since the creation of its first aviation units in the early 1900s.

1910s and 20s

1930s

1940s

1950s

1960s

1970s, 80s and 90s

See also
Brazilian Air Force
List of active Brazilian military aircraft

References

External links
 History of the Brazilian Air Force